Stadion or stade was an ancient running event, part of the Ancient Olympic Games and the other Panhellenic Games. It was one of the five major Pentathlon events. It was the premier event of the gymnikos agon (γυμνικὸς ἀγών "nude competition").

History
From the years 776 to 724 BC, the stadion was the only event that took place at the Olympic Games. The victor gave his name to the entire four-year Olympiad, which has allowed scholars to know the names of nearly every ancient Olympic stadion winner.

The stadion was named after the building in which it took place, also called the stadion. This word became stadium in Latin, which became the English word stadium. The race also gave its name to the unit of length, the stadion. There were other types of running events, but the stadion was the most prestigious; the winner was often considered to be the winner of an entire Games. Though a separate event, the stadion was also part of the ancient Pentathlon.

The race began with a trumpet blow, with officials (the ἀγωνοθέται agonothetai) at the start to make sure there were no false starts. There were also officials at the end to decide on a winner and to make sure no one had cheated. If the officials decided there was a tie, the race would be re-run. Runners started the race from a standing position, probably with their arms stretched out in front of them, instead of starting in a crouch like modern runners. They ran naked on a packed earth track. By the fifth century, the track was marked by a stone-starting line, the balbis. Advancements in this stone starting block led to it having a set of double grooves ( apart) in which the runner placed his toes. The design of these grooves were intended to give the runner leverage for his start.

The winner of the stadion in the first Olympic Games was Coroebus of Elis.

See also
 Running in Ancient Greece
 Olympic winners of the Stadion race

References

Ancient Olympic sports
Events in track and field
Sprint (running)
 Extinct sports